The Khilok Formation is an Early Cretaceous geologic formation in Buryatia, Russia. While the lower portion of the formation consists of sandstone and conglomerates, the upper portion of the formation largely consists of trachybasalt, these deposits have been dated to the Aptian. A thin 20 cm bed is known from the formation containing the remains of numerous indeterminate vertebrates, including dinosaur and pterosaurs and an indeterminate species of Kirgizemys.

Fossil content 
The following fossils were reported from the formation:

Reptiles
 Kirgizemys sp.
 Prodeinodon sp.
 Choristodera indet.
 Dromaeosauridae indet.
 Hypsilophodontidae indet.
 Ornithopoda indet.
 Ornithocheiridae indet.
 Scincomorpha indet.
 Testudines indet.
 Titanosauriformes indet.

Amphibians
 Discoglossidae indet.

Fish
 Hybodus sp.
 Amiiformes indet.
 Palaeonisciformes indet.
 Teleostei indet.

See also 
 List of pterosaur-bearing stratigraphic units
 Murtoi Formation

References 

Geologic formations of Russia
Lower Cretaceous Series of Asia
Cretaceous Russia
Aptian Stage
Conglomerate formations
Sandstone formations
Paleontology in Russia